The Vickery House in Lavonia, Georgia, also known as the Shirley House, is a historic house built around 1900–1905.  It was listed on the National Register of Historic Places in 1983.

It was built for C.W. Vickery, a merchant and the founder of the Vickery Bank.

References

National Register of Historic Places in Franklin County, Georgia
Houses completed in 1900